The Club Deportivo Universidad Católica is a multi-sports organization from Chile representing the Pontificia Universidad Católica de Chile that puts together 14 sport branches, being the most famous the Football branch. The club has the best infrastructure in the country and has the most sport branches than any other club. Until the soccer branch became independent a few years ago, it was this branch that shared its earnings with the other branches, allowing them to survive and succeed.  However, these actions prevented the soccer club to reinvest and compete aggressively at the domestic and international level, where there are other clubs with bigger budgets and funds to invest in players.

Since its foundation, the colors that identify the team are the white and the blue.  While in their club's logo you can see these same colors with red, besides representing it with a cross, showing the club's Catholic character.

History

The Club's foundation was in 1908. Even though the sports activities in the university began years before, the idea from Raúl Agüero in 1925 to gather sport activities from the university under the same name was the beginning of the formation of what became the Club Deportivo Universidad Católica. This way, it began to act as an organized identity and totally dependent from the university on 30 August 1927, when the then director, Monseñor Carlos Casanueva obtained the permits to use Campos de Sports de Ñuñoa for the sporting activities of the university.

It began its participation in the University Confederation of sports in 1928, participating together with the Universidad de Concepción, the Universidad Católica de Valparaíso and the Universidad de Chile.

On 19 April 1937 the university joins the Chilean Football Association. Because of this, a group of students from the university, got together in a house of studies in Santiago de Chile on 21 April 1937 to discuss the organization of the club.  This would become the official date of foundation.

The football branch made its official debut on 13 June 1937 in the then Segunda División of Chilean professional football, in a game against Universidad de Chile, the longtime rival of the club, in the military stadium.

In the beginning part of the 1980s, it began the migration of some sporting branches to the Sporting complex named San Carlos de Apoquindo.

Presidents of the Club
 1937–1938: Augusto Gómez Soto
 1939–1946: Jimmy Rasmusen Bowden
 1947–1949: Óscar Álvarez Lon
 1950–1951: Enrique Casorzo Federici
 1952–1953: Alejandro Duque Lagos
 1953–1954: Carlos Dittborn Pinto
 1954–1955: Sergio Urrejola Rozas
 1955–1956: Enrique Casorzo Federici
 1957–1965: Eduardo Cuevas Valdés
 1966–1967: Enrique Casorzo Federici
 1968–1974: Manuel Vélez Samaniego
 1975–1976: Raúl Devés Jullian
 1976–1977: José Martínez Guichou
 1978–1982: Germán Mayo Correa
 1982–1993: Alfonso Swett Saavedra
 1994–1996: Jorge Claro Mimica
 1996–1998: Manuel Vélez Samaniego
 1999–: Jorge O´Ryan Schütz

Branches

Football

The branch of football of the Sports Club Universidad Católica is the most important one of the institution, becoming one of the most successful and popular teams in Chile. The team is considered one of the three "great ones" from Chile, together with Colo-Colo and Universidad de Chile.

Basketball

The basketball branch of the club currently competes in the Liga Nacional de Básquetbol de Chile, being the most successful team of Chilean basketball history, having won the old professional top-level Dimayor League five times.

The home arena of the team is the Estadio Palestino, located in Las Condes, Santiago. The team former home arena was the Santa Rosa de Las Condes arena, until the club sold it in 2009.

The youth team of the club also plays the international tournament Campioni del Domani which they have won six times.

The historic performance in the middle of the 1980s where they won a record four titles in a row, made the team "catolico" as the team with most wins in the league history.  They also won the title in 2005, with the leadership of Miguel Ureta.

Current roster

Trophies
 Dimayor: 5
1983, 1984, 1985, 1986, 2005
 Dimayor Apertura: 1
1989
 Libcentro: 2
2003, 2004

Notable players
To appear in this section a player must have either:
- Set a club record or won an individual award as a professional player.
- Played at least one official international match for his senior national team.
  Pablo Coro
  Sebastian Silva
  Faron Hand
  Maurice Spillers
  John Woods

Rugby
It is one of the most important teams of Rugby in Chile, having won the national tournament 18 times. For the rugby sports branch, their pants are black in both the official uniform and the alternative.

National tournaments
 Campeonato Central de Rugby: (18):  1949, 1964, 1965, 1975, 1987, 1988, 1989, 1990, 1992, 1995, 1996, 1997, 1998, 1999, 2002, 2003, 2004, 2006.
 Torneo de Apertura: (2): 2004, 2005

Volleyball

This Branch was born in 1942 together with the Chilean Volleyball Association. The participation of José Grisante, sportsman of the club and vice president of the Association that was chaired by Benedicto Kocian of the YMCA, is key in this process.

In 1943 the Association was renamed the Santiago Volleyball Association and in 1955 the Chilean Volleyball Federation was founded, which is chaired by José Grisanti and Francisco Vilarrubias as vice president, both prominent CDUC volleyball players.
These are just the beginning of a long and brilliant history of the crossover, that both in ladies and in men, have been national champions an enormous number of times, being the teams with the most titles at the national level.

National tournaments
Liga Nacional de Voleibol (men): (1): 2004
Liga Nacional de Voleibol (women): (3):  2004, 2005, 2006
SuperVolei (Federación de Vóleibol de Chile) (women): (1): 2008
Copa Providencia (women): (1): 2008

Field Hockey
Liga Nacional de Hockey (men): (1): Apertura 2006

Ski
The branch of ski of the sports club Universidad Católica was founded in 1942 because of the initiative of a group of students from the Pontificia Universidad Católica de Chile.

Anthem
Its lyrics were written by Pedro Fornazzari, Charles Bown and Alberto Buccicardi, the two last were ex players from the club and directors of the magazine revista Estadio.

Emulating the melody used by the supporters of the British club Manchester United, they gave birth to the Anthem of the institution, immortalizing the phrase "Por la Patria, Dios y la Universidad", which translates to "For the country, God and the University".

Sports accommodation
The first stadium that belonged to the university was the Estadio Independencia, opened 14 October 1945.

Years later, the municipality of Las Condes gave, for 99 years, some land located in Santa Rosa, that later on became known as the Santa Rosa de Las Condes Sport complex.

In 1971 the club lost its stadium due to the poor economic situation of the university.

In 1972 it was introduced the first project for a new stadium, that ended up in the opening on 4 September 1988 of the Estadio San Carlos de Apoquindo.

References

External links

 Official club web page
 Fans web page 
 Fans web page
 Fans web page

Universidad Catolica
Universidad Catolica
Club Deportivo Universidad Católica
Universidad Catolica
1937 establishments in Chile
Basketball teams in Chile